Richard Burt Melrose is an Australian mathematician and professor at the Massachusetts Institute of Technology who works on geometric analysis, partial differential equations, and differential geometry.

Education
Melrose received in 1974 his Ph.D. from Cambridge University under F. Gerard Friedlander with thesis Initial and Initial-Boundary Value Problems.

Career
Melrose became a research fellow at St John's College, Cambridge. In 1977 he was a visiting scholar at the Institute for Advanced Study. Since 1976 he has been a professor at MIT, where since 2006 he has been the Simons Professor of Mathematics. From 1999 to 2002 he was the chair of the committee for pure mathematics at MIT.

His doctoral students include Mark S. Joshi, John M. Lee, Rafe Mazzeo, András Vasy, and Maciej Zworski.

Awards
In 1984 Melrose received the Bôcher Memorial Prize for his work on scattering theory. Since 1986 he has been a Fellow of the American Academy of Arts and Sciences. For the academic year 1992–1993 he was a Guggenheim Fellow. He was in 1978 an invited speaker (Singularities of solutions of boundary value problems) at the ICM in Helsinki and in 1990 a plenary speaker (Pseudodifferential operators, corners and singular limits) at the ICM in Kyoto.

Selected publications

Articles
with Shahla Marvizi:

Books
as editor with Michael Beals, Jeffrey Rauch: 

with Antônio Sá Barreto, Maciej Zworski:

References

External links
Web page for Richard Melrose, MIT (with links to mathematical publications)

1949 births
20th-century Australian mathematicians
21st-century Australian mathematicians
Alumni of the University of Cambridge
Australian National University alumni
Differential geometers
Living people
Massachusetts Institute of Technology School of Science faculty
PDE theorists